Dody Alfayed (born 30 August 1998) is an Indonesian professional footballer who plays as a midfielder for Liga 2 club Persijap Jepara.

Club career

Persijap Jepara
He was signed for Persijap Jepara to play in Liga 2 in the 2020 season. This season was suspended on 27 March 2020 due to the COVID-19 pandemic. The season was abandoned and was declared void on 20 January 2021.

References

External links
 Dody Alfayed at Soccerway
 Dody Alfayed at Liga Indonesia

1998 births
Living people
Indonesian footballers
Persijap Jepara players
Association football midfielders
People from Jombang Regency
Sportspeople from East Java